Global News Morning (previously known as Morning News and the Saturday Morning News or the Sunday Morning News on Saturdays and Sundays respectively and the Early Morning News from 5-6 AM) is the name of local morning newscasts airing on Global Television Network's owned-and-operated stations (O&Os) in British Columbia, Calgary, Edmonton, Saskatoon, Regina, Winnipeg, Toronto, Kingston, Peterborough, Montreal, and Halifax with each station producing its own edition of the program. In Ontario, the program was branded The Morning Show, with local variations being produced on Global Toronto, CKWS Kingston, and CHEX Peterborough, before they too adopted the Global News Morning branding.

As part of Shaw Communications' benefit package for acquiring Global and other specialty channels from the bankrupt Canwest, Global O&Os in Toronto, Winnipeg, Regina, Saskatoon, Montreal, and the Maritimes would each launch morning shows for their respective markets. As of January 28, 2013, this promise has been fulfilled by Shaw Media.

On April 11, 2016, Global rebranded its local news programs. Morning News, as well as Sunday/Saturday Morning News and Early Morning News are now all known as Global News Morning.

In June 2018, Global News launched a new "L-frame" news format for their morning programs nationwide. The L-frame, which is similar to that on some 24-hour news channels such as CP24 and Global's Sister network, Global News: BC1, provides constant access to weather, traffic, business, and news headlines throughout the whole show. It launched across the network on June 5, 2018.

The latest editions of Global News Morning to launch were those on Global Kingston (formerly CKWS) and Global Peterborough (formerly CHEX). Originally branded as The Morning Show, these programs follow a similar format to other Global News Morning shows east of Alberta, with national and international news being inserted from Global Toronto.

Global BC

Weekdays
Global News Morning on Global BC airs from 5:00 to 9:00 AM PT on weekdays. It is simulcast on Global Okanagan. The weekday edition of Global News Morning is hosted by Sonia Sunger with Paul Haysom as news anchor, Mark Madryga as meteorologist, and Katelin Owsianski as in studio traffic anchor with Amber Belzer in Global 1 for airborne traffic. Global News Morning is currently British Columbia's most-watched morning show.

Weekends
Global News Morning airs from 7:00am – 10:00am on weekend mornings. This edition is hosted by Jennifer Palma with Stephanie Florian on weather and Jay Janower on sports.

Global Calgary

Weekdays
Global News Morning on Global Calgary airs weekdays at 5:00 to 9:00 AM MT. It is simulcast on Global Lethbridge. Global News Morning on Global Calgary is hosted by Dallas Flexhaug, Blake Lough, Meteorologist Tiffany Lizee, and traffic specialist Leslie Horton. Jordan Witzel was the on-air meteorologist for the program until his departure from the station in May 2021.

Weekends
Global News Morning airs from 7:00am – 10:00am on weekend mornings. Global News Morning on the weekend is hosted by Tracy Nagai and Jodi Hughes.

Global Edmonton

Weekdays
Global News Morning on Global Edmonton airs weekdays from 5:00 AM to 9:00 AM MT. It was previously simulcast on CKSA Lloydminster until Global's disaffiliation in December 2021. It is the most watched morning show in Edmonton, consistently beating the nearest competition by a margin of 6 to 1. Global News Morning is hosted by Vinesh Pratap and Erin Chalmers with Daintre Christensen as traffic reporter and Mike Sobel on weather.

Weekends
Global News Morning airs from 7:00am – 10:00am on weekend mornings. Global News Morning is hosted by Lisa MacGregor and weather specialist Kevin O'Connell.

Global Regina
Global News Morning on Global Regina airs weekdays from 6am to 9am local time. Global News Morning is hosted by Marney Blunt. Global News Morning (then Morning News) was launched in 2012 along with Morning News on Global Winnipeg and Global Saskatoon after Shaw Media promised to launch morning shows in these markets along with Global Toronto, Global Montreal, and Global Maritimes (Halifax).

Global Saskatoon
Global News Morning on Global Saskatoon airs weekdays from 6am to 9am local time. Global News Morning on Global Saskatoon is hosted by Chris Carr with Chantal Wagner as weather specialist. Global News Morning was launched in 2012 along with Global News Morning on Global Winnipeg and Global Regina after Shaw Media promised to launch morning shows in these markets along with Global Toronto, Global Montreal, and Global Maritimes (Halifax).

Global Winnipeg
Global News Morning on Global Winnipeg airs weekday mornings from 6:00 AM to 9:00 AM. It was simulcast on CJBN Kenora, until its closure in early 2017. It debuted on February 6, 2012 and featured the only television news helicopter in Winnipeg, SkyView 1, which has since been grounded. Global News Morning is anchored by Gabrielle Marchand and Corey Callaghan as a field reporter. Long-time weather specialist Mike Koncan announced on November 25, 2016 that he would be leaving Global News Morning to begin presenting the weather on Global News at 6 and Global News at 10. Adriana Zhang joined the show on March 6, 2017 as the new weather specialist, where she stayed until December 21, 2018 when she left Global Winnipeg for CTV Calgary. On April 5, 2019 Shannon Cuciz announced on her Instagram that the following week would be her last. Her final newscast aired on April 12, 2019, Malika Karim took over interm hosting duties for the next six months. Global News Morning (then Morning News) was launched in 2012 along with Morning News on Global Regina and Global Saskatoon after Shaw Media promised to launch morning shows in these markets along with Global Toronto, Global Montreal, and Global Maritimes (Halifax).

Former Personalities
 Fiona Odlum - SkyView1 (now CBC Saskatchewan)
 Derek Taylor - Co-Host/Sports (now Saskatchewan Roughriders Play-by-Play Announcer)
 Eva Kovacs - Anchor (now Communications at The Royal Canadian Mint)
 Megan Bachelor - Reporter/Anchor (now at CBC Vancouver)
 Brittany Greenslade - Reporter/Anchor (still reporting at Global Winnipeg)
 Holly Alexandruk - Anchor
 Cole Deakin - Reporter
 Mike Koncan - Weather Specialist 
 Justine Routhier - SkyView 1 Traffic Reporter (still at Global News Radio 680 CJOB)
 Kevin Hirschfield - Reporter (now anchor for Global News at 10)
 Adriana Zhang - Weather Specialist (now at CTV Calgary)
 Shannon Cuciz - Anchor
 Malika Karim - Anchor (now at CBC Calgary)

Global Toronto, E! Hamilton, Global Kingston, and Global Peterborough

Global Toronto airs Global News Morning from 6AM to 9:00AM ET on weekdays. It is hosted by Antony Robart, Candace Daniel, and Liem Vu. The show is produced from studios located at Corus Quay Building at 25 Dockside Drive in Toronto.

In 2000, parent company Canwest acquired the broadcasting assets of Western International Communications. Among them was CHCH (OnTV), which relaunched in February 2001 as CH Hamilton and the CH system was launched later that year. CHCH debuted CH Morning Live on February 13, 2001 and currently airs from 5:30AM to 9:00AM ET weekdays. It was renamed to Morning Live in 2007 when CH became E! and continues to air after the station was sold to Channel Zero in 2009.

History
The station debuted a morning news program on July 14, 2003 under the title Global News Morning; it was broadcast weekdays 6AM to 9AM ET. The program was renamed Morning News in 2006  in conjunction with Global's network-wide rebranding exercise. This show was broadcast from 81 Barber Greene Road (Global Toronto Office) in Don Mills from 2003 to 2009.

The newscast was cancelled in January 2009 due to low ratings, and was replaced by a simulcast of then-sister station CHCH-TV's more popular Morning Live show, originating in Hamilton, from 7:00 a.m. to 9:00 a.m. The CHCH simulcast was dropped in August 2009 after Canwest sold the Hamilton station to Channel Zero; since then, Global Toronto had aired second-run lifestyle programming in the morning timeslot.

On June 1, 2011, Shaw Communications announced that it would relaunch a morning newscast on Global Toronto in the fall of 2011 under the title The Morning Show, instead of using the Morning News moniker found on other Global O&Os. Kris Reyes, Liza Fromer, Dave Gerry and Daru Dhillon were named as the anchors for the three-hour-long show. It debuted on October 11, 2011.

On August 27, 2012, Dhillon left the show. On the same day, CIII launched The News at Noon.  Antony Robart took over Dhillon's position. The News at Noon was produced in the same Bloor Street studio as The Morning Show. On December 12, 2012, it was announced that The Morning Show would be expanded in early 2013 to include an additional half-hour that would be broadcast nationally.

In June 2016, long-time host of The Morning Show, Liza Fromer, was let go from the station after her contract was not renewed. Her position would not be filled on the local morning show and Carolyn Mackenzie would take her place on the national edition.

In 2017, Corus Entertainment launched two other local morning news programs on their affiliates CHEX Peterborough (now Global Peterborough) and CKWS Kingston (now Global Kingston), also branded The Morning Show. These shows follow a similar format to other Global News Morning programs east of Alberta, with cut-ins to the Toronto version of the show for national and international news headlines.

On January 28, 2019, Corus Entertainment announced the expansion of the national edition of The Morning Show, extending the show's running time from half an hour to one hour beginning in early March 2019. On February 12, 2019, it was also announced that the local edition of The Morning Show from 6am-9am would be rebranded as Global News Morning, following the naming-scheme of other Global morning shows across the country. Additionally, hosts Jeff McArthur and Carolyn Mackenzie will move exclusively to the extended national edition of The Morning Show, while Global News at 11 co-anchor Antony Robart and former Breakfast Television host Jennifer Valentyne will become the anchors of Global News Morning, along with Liem Vu and Marianne Dimain. The changes took place March 4, 2019. At the same time, The Morning Show was also rebranded to Global News Morning on Global Peterborough and Global Kingston. Jennifer Valentyne (laid off July 2020) was replaced with Candace Daniel in 2021.

Former personalities on Global News Morning
 Robin Gill - anchor, 2008–2009 (now with Global National)
 Anne-Marie Mediwake - anchor, 2006–2007; later promoted to Global News Hour Toronto And CBC News Network. Previously with CBC Toronto, now with CTV's national morning show Your Morning.
 Jennifer Valentyne - anchor 2019–2020

Global Montreal
Global News Morning on Global Montreal airs weekday mornings from 6:00 AM to 9:00 AM ET. The program is broadcast from its studios in the Dominion Square Building in Downtown Montreal, and from various locations in Montreal's West Island area. The show is anchored by Laura Casella with Kim Sullivan as weather specialist. Global News Morning was anchored by Camille Ross with Jessica Laventure as weather specialist until June 2016. Her replacement is Laura Casella, previously of Breakfast Television Montreal. Global News Morning was launched in 2013 along with Global News Morning on Global Maritimes after Shaw Media promised to launch morning shows in these markets along with Global Winnipeg, Global Regina, and Global Saskatoon.

History
The Morning News began airing on Global Montreal on January 28, 2013, 5 years after the station's original morning show (This Morning Live) was cancelled.

After being rebranded as Global, Global Montreal aired a live two and a half-hour (and subsequently three) hour weekday morning magazine program called This Morning Live. It was aired in place of cartoons that aired on most Global stations weekday mornings because Quebec provincial law requires children's programming to be shown weekdays commercial-free over the air. A side benefit of this was that it added enough Canadian content to the station's schedule that it could air American talk shows in the afternoon.

The cancellation of This Morning Live was announced in late 2007 and the last program was broadcast on February 27, 2008. To partially make up for the loss of locally produced broadcast hours, the station brought back News Final, which was cancelled in June 2006 due to low ratings.

Long-time Global News Morning personalities Camille Ross and Jessica Laventure both left the show in June 2016. On June 22, Camille Ross announced her departure and officially left on June 23 to move to London, Ontario. Jessica Laventure left on June 30 to work in Punta Cana.

Global Halifax
Global News Morning on Global Halifax airs weekday mornings from 6:00 AM to 10:00 AM AT. It is simulcast on Global New Brunswick. The program is broadcast in high-definition from its new studios on Gottingen Street in Downtown Halifax. It launched on January 28, 2013 and is the only three-hour-long morning news program in the Maritimes. Global News Morning in Halifax is hosted by Alyse Hand and Paul Brothers. Global News Morning (then Morning News) was launched in 2013 along with Morning News on Global Montreal after Shaw Media promised to launch morning shows in these markets along with Global Winnipeg, Global Regina, and Global Saskatoon.

See also
 Global News
 Rival morning programs include:
Canada AM on CTV and CTV News Channel (now cancelled)
 Your Morning on CTV and CTV News Channel (replacement for Canada AM)
 CTV Morning Live on select CTV and CTV 2 local stations
 Breakfast Television on Citytv
 CBC News Now on CBC and CBC News Network
 News Hour
 The Morning Show

References

External links
 Global News launches new Toronto morning show
 Canwest eliminates morning and noon TV newscasts at Global Toronto
Shaw Benefits Proposal Includes $43-million for Morning News

Television morning shows in Canada
Global Television Network original programming
1990s Canadian television series debuts
1990s Canadian television news shows
2000s Canadian television news shows
2010s Canadian television news shows
2020s Canadian television news shows
Television series by Corus Entertainment
Television shows filmed in Burnaby
Television shows filmed in Calgary
Television shows filmed in Edmonton
Television shows filmed in Halifax, Nova Scotia
Television shows filmed in Kingston, Ontario
Television shows filmed in Montreal
Television shows filmed in Regina, Saskatchewan
Television shows filmed in Saskatoon
Television shows filmed in Toronto
Television shows filmed in Winnipeg